Spilosoma latipennis, the pink-legged tiger moth, or the red-legged diacrisia, is a moth in the family Erebidae. It was described by Richard Harper Stretch in 1872. It is found in eastern North America, where it has been recorded from Georgia, Indiana, Iowa, Kansas, Kentucky, Maine, Maryland, New Brunswick, New York, North Carolina, Ohio, Ontario, Pennsylvania, South Carolina, West Virginia and Wisconsin.

The wingspan is about 38 mm. Adults are on wing from April to September.

The larvae feed on various plants, including ash trees, dandelions, impatiens and plantain.

References

External References

Spilosoma latipennis at BOLD

Moths described in 1872
latipennis